BUKO Pharma-Kampagne is an independent organization based in Bielefeld, Germany, which watches over the marketing practices of German pharmaceutical companies.

It has gained wider recognition after being described in a bestselling novel, The Constant Gardener by John le Carré. BUKO was mentioned explicitly in the author's afterword as a real counterpart to the novel's fictitious Hippo organisation (also based in Bielefeld, Germany).

BUKO is partially financed by the European Union and mostly by private supporters.

In early 1981 following a conference in Geneva, co-sponsored by the International Organization of Consumers Unions and by BUKO, it set up Health Action International.

See also
The Constant Gardener – the movie (2005) by Fernando Meirelles
World Health Organization Research Ethics Review Committee

References

External links 
BUKO Homepage
Health Action International

Pharmaceutical industry
Medical and health organisations based in North Rhine-Westphalia